David James Mulligan (born 24 March 1982) is a New Zealand former football player and head coach.

Born in England, he began his career at Barnsley, making his first-team debut in October 2001. He became a first-team regular in the 2001–02 and 2002–03 seasons, before joining Doncaster Rovers in February 2004. He helped the club to the Third Division title in the 2003–04 campaign. He was signed to Scunthorpe United in June 2006 and won the League One title with the club in 2006–07. He was loaned out to Grimsby Town in November 2007 and took a free transfer to Port Vale in January 2008. He returned to New Zealand six months later to sign with A-League club Wellington Phoenix. He joined New Zealand Football Championship club Auckland City in 2010 and helped the club to two successive OFC Champions League titles, before he moved to Waitakere United in 2012, and Hawke's Bay United in 2013. He returned to Waitakere United the next year.

He earned national representation at under-17, under-20, under-23 and full international level. He was selected for two FIFA Confederations Cup competitions, and was also named in the 2010 FIFA World Cup squad. He earned 28 senior caps and scored three goals in World Cup qualification matches with Vanuatu.

He began his coaching career as head coach at East Coast Bays in October 2016.

Club career

Barnsley
Mulligan was born in Liverpool, England, but his family moved to New Zealand when he was five years old. He returned to England at the age of 16, along with Rory Fallon, to join the youth-team at Barnsley; the move had been arranged by Rory's father Kevin, who was an assistant to New Zealand head coach John Adshead. He made his professional debut for the club under Glyn Hodges's caretaker stewardship in a 3–0 defeat to Manchester City at Oakwell on 31 October 2001. Steve Parkin's "Tykes" were relegated out of the First Division at the end of the 2001–02 season, but Mulligan retained his place in the Second Division for the 2002–03 campaign. He scored his first senior goal in a 2–1 defeat at Oldham Athletic on 5 April 2003. However he lost his first team place under Guðjón Þórðarson early in the 2003–04 campaign and was released by Barnsley in October 2003, despite having been offered a new contract just five months earlier.

Doncaster Rovers
Mulligan had an unsuccessful trial at Sheffield United during a four-month spell without a club. He joined Third Division leaders Doncaster Rovers in February 2004, initially on a match-to-match basis, then on a short-term contract, before he was rewarded with a two-year contract after Doncaster won promotion as champions at the end of the 2003–04 season. He quickly established himself at the Keepmoat Stadium, but again ran into trouble early into the 2004–05 season, being placed on the transfer list by "Donny" in November 2004. He went nowhere however and on 29 November he provided an assist in a 3–0 victory over Premier League side Aston Villa in the League Cup. On 4 December, he scored two free-kicks – from 25 and 20 yards – in a 2–1 win over Boston United in the FA Cup. He remained a regular starter up until the end of the 2005–06 campaign. The utility player was offered a contract by manager Dave Penney in the summer of 2006, but the two sides failed to agree terms.

Scunthorpe United
In June 2006, Mulligan signed for League One side Scunthorpe United, having met manager Brian Laws at a M180 motorway service station to discuss the situation at Glanford Park. He made 29 appearances throughout the 2006–07 season as Scunthorpe secured promotion as champions of League One. However he never took to the field in the Championship due to differences with manager Nigel Adkins; he had been involved in a car accident and been late to training, and also had to miss games due to international commitments. He joined League Two side Grimsby Town on a one-month loan on 30 August 2007. He made his debut for the "Mariners" on 2 September, in a 2–1 defeat at Shrewsbury Town, coming onto the pitch as a 36th-minute substitute only to be taken off after 63 minutes; he said this was typical bizarre management from Alan Buckley, who made players come to Blundell Park for sprint training on days after games.

Port Vale
He joined Port Vale on a free transfer in January 2008. He made 13 appearances in the 2007–08 season as the "Valiants" were relegated out of League One; he scored a free-kick on the last day of the season in a 1–1 draw at Southend United. His stay at Vale Park was to prove a relatively short one as manager Lee Sinnott declined to offer Mulligan a longer contract.

New Zealand
Mulligan signed a two-year contract with the Wellington Phoenix in July 2008. However he struggled to make an impact and made just three appearances for the club in two seasons before his contract was not renewed at the end of the 2009–10 season. He later commented that "I always had an idea of coming back to New Zealand. It was more of the lifestyle change, rather than football. There’s nothing better than playing football in the sun!"

Mulligan soon signed on with New Zealand Football Championship club Auckland City for the 2010–11 season. He made his debut in the opening round match against Waikato in which he scored two goals in the second half, to give the "Navy Blues" a 3–2 victory. He played both legs of the 2011 final of the OFC Champions League, as Auckland beat Amicale (Vanuatu) 6–1 on aggregate. Auckland won the Champions League for a second successive season in 2012, and this time Mulligan scored one of the goals in a 3–1 aggregate win over AS Tefana (French Polynesia). He switched to rivals Waitakere United in July 2012. The club won the Premiership in 2012–13. He moved on to Hawke's Bay United in October 2013, and helped the club to a third-place finish in 2013–14. He returned to Waitakere United for the 2014–15 season, who finished the season in fourth place.

International career
Mulligan played for NZ Under-17 at the 1999 FIFA U-17 World Championship and scored two goals in their two pool matches against the United States and Poland. Mulligan played for NZ Under-23 at the 2004 Athens Olympics qualification tournament for the Oceania Football Confederation, however New Zealand lost out to Australia and did not qualify for the Olympics.

He made his debut for "All Whites" in an international friendly against Estonia on 13 October 2002, which ended in a 3–2 defeat. He was named in the 2003 FIFA Confederations Cup squad in France by head coach Mick Waitt. He was also in the 2004 OFC Nations Cup squad and played in the 3–0 win over the Solomon Islands. He scored in a 2–1 win at Vanuatu in a World Cup qualifier on 17 November 2007 and also scored a brace in the return fixture four days later. He featured in all six games of the 2008 OFC Nations Cup, which New Zealand won ahead of New Caledonia, Fiji and Vanuatu.

He was named as part of the New Zealand squad for the 2009 FIFA Confederations Cup in June 2009. He made two starting appearances at right-back in defeats to Spain and South Africa, as well as a substitute appearance in the 0–0 draw with Iraq. Mulligan was named in New Zealand's final 23-man squad to compete at the 2010 FIFA World Cup in South Africa; he had been selected by head coach Ricki Herbert despite Herbert having released him at Wellington Phoenix. However he did not feature in any of the games in the tournament itself.

Style of play
Mulligan was a two-footed player, able to play in midfield or at right-back. He was an accomplished free-kick taker.

Coaching career
Mulligan was appointed as head coach at Northern League club East Coast Bays in October 2016.

Personal life
He married Michelle and the couple had their first child, Eden-Lily, in February 2017.

Career statistics

Club statistics

International statistics

International goals

Honours
New Zealand
OFC Nations Cup: 2004

Doncaster Rovers
Football League Third Division: 2003–04

Scunthorpe United
League One: 2006–07

Auckland City
OFC Champions League: 2011, 2012

Waitakere United
New Zealand Football Championship: 2012–13

References

1982 births
Living people
Sportspeople from Bootle
New Zealand people of English descent
New Zealand association footballers
New Zealand international footballers
Association football defenders
Barnsley F.C. players
Doncaster Rovers F.C. players
Scunthorpe United F.C. players
Grimsby Town F.C. players
Port Vale F.C. players
Wellington Phoenix FC players
Auckland City FC players
Waitakere United players
English Football League players
A-League Men players
Expatriate footballers in England
New Zealand expatriate sportspeople in England
New Zealand Football Championship players
2003 FIFA Confederations Cup players
2004 OFC Nations Cup players
2008 OFC Nations Cup players
2009 FIFA Confederations Cup players
2010 FIFA World Cup players
New Zealand association football coaches
New Zealand youth international footballers
New Zealand under-20 international footballers
New Zealand under-23 international footballers